Alain Rakotondramanana (born 16 April 1970) is a Malagasy footballer currently plays for USCA Foot.

External links
 

1970 births
Living people
Malagasy footballers

Association football defenders
USCA Foot players
Madagascar international footballers